Events in the year 1953 in the People's Republic of China.

Incumbents 
 Chairman of the Chinese Communist Party – Mao Zedong
 Chairman of the Government – Mao Zedong
 Vice Chairmen of the Government – Zhu De Liu Shaoqi, Song Qingling, Li Jishen, Zhang Lan, Gao Gang
 Premier – Zhou Enlai
 Vice Premiers – Dong Biwu, Chen Yun, Guo Moruo, Huang Yanpei, Deng Xiaoping

Governors  
 Governor of Anhui Province – Zeng Xisheng 
 Governor of Fujian Province – Zhang Dingcheng 
 Governor of Gansu Province – Deng Baoshan
 Governor of Guangdong Province – Ye Jianying (until September), Tao Zhu (starting September)
 Governor of Guizhou Province – Yang Yong 
 Governor of Hebei Province – Yang Xiufeng 
 Governor of Heilongjiang Province – Zhao Dezun then Chen Lei  
 Governor of Henan Province – Wu Zhipu 
 Governor of Hubei Province – Li Xiannian   
 Governor of Hunan Province – Cheng Qian 
 Governor of Jiangsu Province – Tan Zhenlin  
 Governor of Jiangxi Province – Shao Shiping 
 Governor of Jilin Province – Li Youwen 
 Governor of Liaoning Province – Du Zheheng 
 Governor of Qinghai Province – Zhang Zhongliang 
 Governor of Shaanxi Province – Zhao Shoushan
 Governor of Shandong Province – Kang Sheng 
 Governor of Shanxi Province – Pei Lisheng 
 Governor of Sichuan Province – Li Jingquan 
 Governor of Yunnan Province – Chen Geng 
 Governor of Zhejiang Province – Tan Zhenlin

Events
 July 15 – FAW Group (First Automobile Group) was founded.
 July 27 – The Korean War ends: United Nations Command (Korea) (United States), People's Republic of China, North Korea sign an armistice agreement.
 September 5 – The United Nations rejects the Soviet Union's suggestion to accept the People's Republic of China as a member.

Births
 July 8 - Zhou Long, Pulitzer-prize-winning Chinese American composer
 April 4 - Chen Yi, Chinese violinist and composer of contemporary classical music
 Jing Jing Luo, a Chinese composer
 June 15 - Xi Jinping, General Secretary of the Communist Party (paramount leader) and 7th President of China

Deaths
 September 17 – Wenxiu, consort of China's last emperor Puyi (born 1909).
 September 26 – Xu Beihong, Chinese painter (born 1895)

See also 
 1953 in Chinese film

References 

 
Years of the 20th century in China
China